Özalakadı is a village in the Suluova District, Amasya Province, Turkey. Its population is 56 (2021).

References

Villages in Suluova District